Hugh Metcalfe is a musician and filmmaker from London and Suffolk, England. He is best known as the promoter of The Klinker in London, a club which he has run in various venues since at least 1982 (stories vary). He plays guitar, violin, hi-hat and gas mask. He performs in several bands including Bicycle Clip Sex, The Small Faeces, The Cross-Dressed Quartet and Fuck Off Batman. He also performed with noted sound poet Bob Cobbing, saxophonist Lol Coxhill and dancer Jennifer Pike in Birdyak, up until Cobbing's death in 2002.

Metcalfe's experimental film work began in 1978, and uses 8mm film methods to produce silent films, often used later as a springboard for free musical improvisation, either by Metcalfe himself or other musicians. During some of the 1980s, Metcalfe ran a record label, 'Klinkerzoundz', releasing records by Metcalfe, Cobbing, the Bow Gamelan Ensemble, and more.

The Klinker has, in its 30-year lifespan, acquired a reputation as London's leading forum for free improvisation and marginal music and performance.

External links
Klinker Club website
Hugh Metcalfe 
Hugh Metcalfe 2013 Tour

References

Living people
English rock guitarists
English male guitarists
Crossover (music)
Place of birth missing (living people)
Year of birth missing (living people)
Musicians from London